Autosticha cuspidata is a moth in the family Autostichidae. It was described by Kyu-Tek Park and Chun-Sheng Wu in 2003. It is found in Hainan, China.

The wingspan is 11–12 mm. The forewings are creamy white, sparsely scattered with dark fuscous scales. There are two large black dots at the subbasal area. The first discal stigma is found at the middle, the plical below it and the second at the end of the cell. There are two black dots on the costa at the middle and three smaller dots beyond it along the costal margin. There are three to four similar dots along the termen and a brownish suffusion before the tornus. The hindwings are pale grey.

Etymology
The species name refers to the pointed uncus and is derived from cuspidis (meaning pointed).

References

Moths described in 2003
Autosticha
Moths of Asia